Olha Kondrashova is a Ukrainian competitor in synchronized swimming.

She is multiple European championships medalist.

References
Ukrainian synchronized swimming national team won qualification for Olympics

Year of birth missing (living people)
Living people
Ukrainian synchronized swimmers
European Aquatics Championships medalists in synchronised swimming
21st-century Ukrainian women